Deh Sefid Darvish (also Romanized as Deh Sefīd Darvīsh; also known as Deh-e Sefīd) is a village in Khomeh Rural District, in the Central District of Aligudarz County, Lorestan Province, Iran. At the 2006 census, its population was 120, in 24 families.

References 

Towns and villages in Aligudarz County